P. Lakshmi Narayana (10 September 1935 – 3 November 1998) was an Indian actor, dialogue writer, and playwright, known for his works predominantly in Telugu cinema and a few Tamil films. He has received one National Film Award and five state Nandi Awards.

Awards
National Film Awards
National Film Award for Best Supporting Actor - Yagnam (1991)

Nandi Awards
 Best Supporting Actor for his portrayal in Kukka.
 Best Supporting Actor for his portrayal in Neti Bharatam in 1983.
 Special Jury Award for his performance in Mayuri in 1985.
 Best Supporting Actor for his acting skills in Repati Pourulu in 1986.
 Best Dialogue Writer for his writing skills in Dandora in 1993.

Selected filmography

References

Male actors in Tamil cinema
1935 births
1998 deaths
Telugu male actors
Best Supporting Actor National Film Award winners
Nandi Award winners
20th-century Indian male actors
Indian male film actors
Male actors in Telugu cinema
People from Guntur district